Michael George Jackson (born 2 November 1947) is an English singer-songwriter and the co-writer of the song, "Blame It on the Boogie". The song was co-authored by Mick's brother David Jackson and Elmar Krohn, and produced by Sylvester Levay.

Jackson recorded his version first and The Jacksons' management team picked up the song at Midem, the music industry trade fair in Cannes, where it was offered to them by Mick Jackson's publisher without Jackson's knowledge. Due to a delay at the pressing plant which was producing Mick Jackson's single, in the UK the two versions were released within weeks of each other.

The press at the time enjoyed the similarity in the names and release coincidence, calling the situation 'The Battle of the Boogie' as the two records jockeyed for chart positions. Radio stations got on the battle bandwagon. BBC Radio One only played The Jacksons' version, Capital Radio only played Mick's single. The music press was equally split. Melody Maker  did not review Mick Jackson's version, but praised the Jacksons and wrongly referred to their single as a "self-penned song" (16 September 1978), whereas NME hailed Mick Jackson as the winner of the battle, calling his version "far superior" (7 October 1978).

Mick Jackson's original peaked at No. 15 and The Jacksons peaked at No. 8 in the UK Singles Chart. Mick Jackson's subsequent 1979 release, "Weekend" was released in the same week as The Jacksons' second single "Destiny". The songs entered the charts on the same day, peaking at 38 and 39 in the UK Singles Chart respectively, and both 'Michael Jacksons' appearing on the same edition of Top of The Pops. "Weekend" spent eight weeks on the chart; thus equalling his earlier single's tenure, and also avoiding the one-hit wonder tag.

Jackson released three albums – Weekend (1978 – Atlantic Records), Step Inside My Rainbow (1980 – CBS Records) and Square Deal (1982).

He has worked with many artists such as David Knopfler, Eric Burdon, Lisa Stansfield and Barry Manilow.

In 2010, filmmaker Patrick Nation made a Channel 4 documentary about Jackson, entitled The Other Michael Jackson: Battle of the Boogie. The documentary was co-written and presented by Mick's son Sam Peter Jackson, and it led to Mick Jackson's 1978 album, Weekend, (which featured the original version of "Blame it on the Boogie") being re-released (for download on iTunes) for the first time in thirty years by Demon Music. To promote the documentary, Jackson gave a rare television interview to BBC Breakfast.

See also
List of former Atlantic Records artists
List of disco artists (L-R)

References

External links
Discography

1947 births
Living people
English male singers
English songwriters
Musicians from Yorkshire
Atlantic Records artists
British male songwriters